There are 51 private schools in San Jose, California, USA (excluding those whose students finish before the fifth grade).
 Almaden Country School
 Archbishop Mitty High School
 Bellarmine College Preparatory
 Holy Spirit School
 Liberty Baptist School
 Mulberry School
 Notre Dame High School
 Presentation High School
 Saint Andrew's Episcopal School
 St Leo The Great School
 The Harker School
 Valley Christian Schools

External links 
 California Department of Education

Private schools in San Jose, California
San Jose